Tarzan, the Ape Man is a 1959 American action adventure film released by Metro-Goldwyn-Mayer starring Denny Miller as Tarzan, Joanna Barnes as Jane, Cesare Danova, and Robert Douglas. The film is loosely based on Edgar Rice Burroughs' novel Tarzan of the Apes, and is a remake of the classic 1932 film of the same name. The film was directed by Joseph M. Newman, and the score was composed by jazz musician Shorty Rogers. MGM would release another remake of the film in 1981.

MGM reused a fair amount of footage from their 1932 version rather than reshooting, including scenes of Tarzan swinging on vines and the elephants' destruction of a pygmy village. A scene of Tarzan fighting a crocodile was reused from Tarzan and His Mate, the sequel to the 1932 film. Other footage was reused from King Solomon's Mines. Tarzan's distinctive call was also taken from the original version. The "African" elephants in some scenes are clearly Indian ones with some sort of canvas "ears" added, and with the characteristic double humps on the forehead all too obvious.

The "jungle" vegetation, from three different continents, an extremely phoney looking rubber mask used for close ups of a roaring leopard and the clumsy back-projection in the "underwater" scenes make it a treat for lovers of the ludicrous.

Plot 

The plot of the film reprises that of the 1932 version, with James Parker (Robert Douglas) Harry Holt (Cesare Danova) and Parker's daughter Jane (Joanna Barnes) on an expedition in Africa in which they encounter Tarzan (Denny Miller), a wild man raised by apes. Various adventures ensue.

Cast
 Denny Miller as Tarzan
 Cesare Danova as Harry Holt
 Joanna Barnes as Jane Parker
 Robert Douglas as Colonel James Parker
 Thomas Yangha as Riano (uncredited)

Production
The film was made at the same time as another Tarzan film, Tarzan's Greatest Adventure produced by Sy Weintraub. MGM had kept the remake rights to the 1932 Tarzan the Ape Man, enabling them to make this film. The rights to the bulk of the Tarzan stories were owned by Weintraub.

Box office
According to MGM records the film earned $660,000 in the US and Canada and $1,050,000 elsewhere resulting in a profit of $92,000.

Musical score and soundtrack

The film score was composed, arranged and conducted by Shorty Rogers and the soundtrack album was released on the MGM label in 1960 as Shorty Rogers Meets Tarzan.

Reception

The AllMusic review by Scott Yanow says "Although there are many short solos, the emphasis is on the dense and frequently exciting ensembles. The music, which is heard here in full-length form (unlike in the movie, where it is often buried behind the action), sounds quite self-sufficient apart from the action".

Track listing
All compositions by Shorty Rogers''
 "The Elephant Walk" – 3:25  
 "Les Barbaros" – 1:40  
 "Paradise Found" – 3:05  
 "Trapped" – 1:55  
 "Los Primitivos" – 2:14  
 "Oomgawa" – 3:15  
 "Tarzanic Suite" – 17:34

Personnel
 Shorty Rogers – flugelhorn, arranger, conductor
 Buddy Childers, Don Fagerquist, Ollie Mitchell, Al Porcino – trumpet 
 Harry Betts, Frank Rosolino – trombone
 Bob Enevoldsen – valve trombone
 Marshall Cram – bass trombone
 Bud Shank – flute, alto saxophone
 Bill Perkins – flute, tenor saxophone 
 Bob Cooper – oboe, tenor saxophone
 Bill Holman – tenor saxophone
 Bill Hood – tenor saxophone, baritone saxophone
 Chuck Gentry – baritone saxophone
 Pete Jolly – piano
 Buddy Clark, Joe Mondragon – bass 
 Frank Capp – drums
 Frank Guerrero – timbales
 Modesto Durán, Rafael Rosario – congas
 Chacho González – bongos

References

External links
 
 
 
 
 ERBzine Silver Screen: Tarzan, the Ape Man

1959 films
1950s action adventure films
1950s fantasy adventure films
American action adventure films
Remakes of American films
Films based on American novels
Films directed by Joseph M. Newman
Metro-Goldwyn-Mayer films
Tarzan films
American fantasy adventure films
1950s English-language films
1950s American films